Zindagi 50–50 is a 2013 Indian Hindi erotic film directed by Rajiv S Ruia. It stars Veena Malik, Rajan Verma, Supriya Kumari, Arya Babbar, Riya Sen and Rajpal Yadav. This film dubbed is in Tamil titled Mutham Thara Vaa and in Telugu as Rangeela.

Plot
Zindagi 50-50 revolves around three different stories . Zindagi means Life - Sometimes it's fun, and sometimes it's a curse - but it's just a point of view. People prays to god for happiness, so that they can enjoy their life. But the God says that he had already given a life to them, to enjoy all the happiness. It has been said that, the way you asks question to your life, it answers you in the same manner. "Zindagi 50:50" is the same story of such question and answers - It's a story of Rupa (A Housewife), Madhuri (Prostitute_ and Naina (A Struggling Actress). Rupa's husband, Birju (Auto Driver) has a dream of getting a house. To fulfill his dream, Rupa breaks all the limits of her life. To complete her dream of house, CR Lele (Government Servant) pushes her in a dark side of her life, where she gets the house, but also gets a smirch on her respect. Zindagi 50:50 is a story of special dreams of a common man. And to fulfill those dreams, he has to struggle a lot, but sometimes they gets it easily and sometime he has to lose everything, "Zindagi 50:50" has this same of losing and getting.

Cast
Veena Malik – Madhuri
Riya Sen – Naina
Rajan Verma – Birju
Arya Babbar – Addy
Supriya Kumari – Rupa
Rajpal Yadav – PK Lele
Murli Sharma – INS Pawar
Atul Parchure – Mota
Adi Irani
Kurush Deboo – Director Subhash Kapoor

Music
The music for Zindagi 50–50 is given by Amjad Nadeem and Vivek Kar consist of following Audio List. Veteran composer Bappi Lahiri sung for Vivek Kar in this film title track.

Soundtrack

T-Series acquired the music rights for Zindagi 50–50

Critical reception

Prasanna D Zore for Rediff.com has given 2/5 stars and says Zindagi 50–50 makes a brave but half-hearted effort to depict the dark cruelty that surrounds ordinary lives of three women. It fails miserably as sleaze—of language as well as skin—overtakes the proceedings. In Short, The movie is ok for a one time watch.

This movie earned 20–40 million in opening.

References

External links
 

2013 films
Indian erotic drama films
Films scored by Vivek Kar
Films scored by Amjad Nadeem
2010s erotic drama films
2010s Hindi-language films